Ethel Falu Sigimanu is a government official in the Solomon Islands. In 2017 she was reassigned from the role of permanent secretary at the Ministry of Women, Youth and Children Affairs to permanent secretary at the Ministry of Justice and Legal Affairs.

As part of her role, Sigimanu advocated for the passage of the Family Protection Act 2014, the first domestic violence legislation in Solomon Islands, and the Child and Family Welfare Act 2017. She also developed and reviewed national gender equality and women's development policies and was the co-ordinator of the Solomon Islands Family Health and Safety Study; the study published its findings in 2009, leading to an increased government focus on domestic and gender violence in the home.

Sigimanu serves on a number of national and regional boards particularly in the areas of gender and human rights.

References

Living people
Year of birth missing (living people)
Women government ministers of the Solomon Islands
21st-century women politicians
Women's ministers
Female justice ministers